Central American and Caribbean youth bests in the sport of athletics are the all-time best marks set in competition by aged 17 or younger throughout the entire calendar year of the performance and competing for a member nation of the Central American and Caribbean Athletic Confederation (CACAC). CACAC doesn't maintain an official list for such performances. All bests shown on this list are tracked by statisticians not officially sanctioned by the governing body.

Outdoor

Boys

Girls

Indoor

Boys

Girls

References

Youth
CAC
Athletics in Central America
Athletics in the Caribbean